The following is a list of the monastic houses in Worcestershire, England.

See also
 List of monastic houses in England

Notes

References

Medieval sites in England
Houses in Worcestershire
Worcestershire
Worcestershire
Lists of buildings and structures in Worcestershire